A number of political parties operate in the Indian state of Jharkhand. Some of them are organised nationally, and others within the region.

Major national parties
 Bharatiya Janata Party (BJP)
 Indian National Congress (INC)

Minor national-level parties
 Janata Dal (United) (JDU)
 Rashtriya Janata Dal (RJD)
 All India Trinamool Congress (TMC) led by  Kameswar Baitha  State President of All India Trinamool Congress Jharkhand State
 Nationalist Congress Party (NCP) by Sharad Pawar
 Communist Party of India (CPI)
 Communist Party of India (Marxist) (CPM)
 All India Majlis-e-Ittehadul Muslimeen (AIMIM)
 All India Forward Bloc (AIFB)
 Bahujan Mukti Party (BMP)
 Aam Aadmi Party (AAP)

Regional parties
 Jharkhand Mukti Morcha (JMM) led by Shibu Soren
 Jharkhand Mukti Morcha - Ulgulan (JMM-U) led by Krishna Mardi
 All Jharkhand Students Union (AJSU) led by Sudesh Mahto
 Jharkhand People's Party led by Surya Singh Besra
 Jharkhand Party (Anosh Ekka) led by Anosh Ekka
 Jharkhand Party (Horo) led by Late Niral Enem Horo
 Jharkhand Party (Naren) led by Naren
 United Jharkhand Party founded by Late Justin Richard
 All India Jharkhand Party
 Jharkhand Jan Kranti Morcha led by Amrendra Kumar ( Munni )
 Hul Jharkhand Party led by Late Justin Richard
 Progressive Hul Jharkhand Party
 Rajya Hul Jharkhand Party
 Birsa Seva Dal led by Lalit Kuzur
 Rashtriya Sengel Party
 Adivasi-Moolvasi Janadhikar Manch
 Marxist Co-ordination Committee led by A. K. Roy

Defunct regional parties
 Jharkhand Vikas Morcha (Prajatantrik) (JVM-P) led by Babulal Marandi (Merged With BJP in 2020)
 Jai Bharat Samanta Party led by Madhu Koda in 2018 Merged with Indian National Congress.
 Jharkhand Disom Party led by Salkhan Murmu (Merged With BJP)
 Jharkhand Vananchal Congress led by Samresh Singh (Merged With BSP)
 Jharkhand Mukti Morcha (B) led by Binod Bihari Mahato (Merged With JMM)
 Jharkhand Vikas Dal led by Suraj Mandal  (Merged With BJP)
 Jharkhand Janadhikar Manch (JJM) led by Bandhu Tirkey 
 United Goans Democratic Party led by  Joba Majhi
 Rastriya Kalyan Pakshya (RKP) led by Chamra Linda (Merged With JMM)
 Jharkhand Mukti Morcha (Suraj Mandal) led by Suraj Mandal (Merged With JMM)
 Bihar Progressive Hul Jharkhand Party led by Shibu Soren (Merged With JMM)

See also
Political parties in Bihar

References

List of parties in Jharkhand